Perrin Air Force Station (ADC ID: RP-78, NORAD ID: Z-78) is a closed United States Air Force General Surveillance Radar station. It was closed in 1969.

History
Perrin Air Force Station was established in 1962 as an annex of Duncanville AFS, TX with an AN/FPS-20 search radar and an AN/FPS-6 height-finder radar, and initially the station functioned as a Ground-Control Intercept (GCI) and warning station.  As a GCI station, the squadron's role was to guide interceptor aircraft toward unidentified intruders picked up on the unit's radar scopes.  At the end of 1963 the site was performing duty as a joint-use facility for the Federal Aviation Administration and Air Defense Command.

In 1964 the 745th Aircraft Control and Warning Squadron relocated to Perrin from Duncanville AFS after it was closed.  Upon activation it was designated as RP-78, replacing the P-78 site at Duncanville.  It was also designated as NORAD site Z-78.  Also in 1964 the search radar was upgraded to an AN/FPS-20A; in 1965, this radar was further upgraded to an AN/FPS-66.

The 745th AC&W Squadron was inactivated on 30 September 1969 and Perrin AFS was closed due to a draw-down of ADC and budget constraints.  Today the former radar site is used by small businesses in the area.

Air Force units and assignments 
Units:
 745th Aircraft Control and Warning Squadron, Assigned 1 July 1964
 Inactivated on 30 September 1969

Assignments:
 Oklahoma City Air Defense Sector, 1 July 1964
 31st Air Division, 1 April 1966 – 30 September 1969

See also
 List of USAF Aerospace Defense Command General Surveillance Radar Stations

References

  A Handbook of Aerospace Defense Organization 1946 - 1980,  by Lloyd H. Cornett and Mildred W. Johnson, Office of History, Aerospace Defense Center, Peterson Air Force Base, Colorado
 Winkler, David F. (1997), Searching the skies: the legacy of the United States Cold War defense radar program. Prepared for United States Air Force Headquarters Air Combat Command.
 Information for Perrin AFS, TX

Radar stations of the United States Air Force
Installations of the United States Air Force in Texas
Military installations closed in 1969
Aerospace Defense Command military installations
1964 establishments in Texas
1969 disestablishments in Texas
Military installations established in 1964